Baek Seung-chul (born on March 9, 1975) is a former South Korea football player.
He was winner of K League Best XI in 1998. He was famous of wanders goal in 1998 K League playoff, but he retired because of serious injury.

References

 Baek Seung-chul player Story-1
 Baek Seung-chul player Story-2
 Baek Seung-chul player Story-3

External links
 

1975 births
Living people
Association football midfielders
South Korean footballers
Pohang Steelers players
K League 1 players